Verkhnekudashevo (Ürge Qoźaş) is a rural locality (a selo) and the administrative centre of Kudashevsky Selsoviet, Tatyshlinsky District, Bashkortostan, Russia. The population was 789 as of 2010. There are 13 streets.

Geography 
Verkhnekudashevo is located 11 km west of Verkhniye Tatyshly (the district's administrative centre) by road. Kardagushevo is the nearest rural locality.

References 

Rural localities in Tatyshlinsky District